Under and Tuglas Literature Centre (abbreviated UTKK) is an scientific institution, which deals with Estonian literature. The Centre is located in Tallinn, Estonia. The Centre subordinates to Estonian Academy of Sciences. The Centre is named after Estonian writers Marie Under and Friedebert Tuglas.

The Centre was established in 1993. Its predecessors were Estonian Academy of Sciences' Language and Literature Institute's section and Friedebert Tuglas House Museum (established in 1971).

The Centre gives out periodical publications Collegium litterarum and Oxymora.

References

External links
 

Research institutes in Estonia
Estonian literature